Buhle may refer to:

Johann Gottlieb Buhle (1763–1821), German philosopher
Kathleen Buhle, American author and non-profit executive
Mari Jo Buhle (born 1943), American historian
Paul Buhle (born 1944), American historian
Buhlebendalo "Buhle" Mda (born 1988),South African Singer

See also
Buhler (disambiguation)
Behle
Bohle